Stoa is an industrial village and a buisnes area in Arendal municipality in Agder county, Norway. The village is located along the European route E18 highway and along the Arendalsbanen railway line. The villages of Bjorbekk and Vrengen lie a short distance to the south.

References

Villages in Agder
Arendal